Huaynacotas District is one of eleven districts of the province La Unión in Peru.

Geography 
The Wansu mountain range traverses the province. Some of the highest peaks of the province are listed below:

Ethnic groups 
The people in the district are mainly indigenous citizens of Quechua descent. Quechua is the language which the majority of the population (71.98%) learnt to speak in childhood, 27.11% of the residents started speaking using the Spanish language (2007 Peru Census).

See also 
 Wansuqucha

References